Mattakkara is a part of Kottayam District mainly spread in Akalakunnam Panchayath. This is considered as the biggest kara (land) in Kottayam. The place is accessible by local roads.

Demographics 
The area is divided by the Pannagam Thodu stream. This has got its name as it flows in a shape of snake (pannagam). The main faiths of Mattakkara are Christianity and Hinduism. People speak Malayalam in their own slang. More than 98% of them are literate.

Most of the people are farmers.  The main cultivation is rubber. You can find pepper, paddy, banana, coffee, tapioca and coconut trees like any other place of Kerala in Mattakkara.

Education 
The Top Engineering College in Mattakara is TOMS College of Engineering. There is Polytechnic Diploma College under TOMS College.There are many schools like Mattakkara H.S, in the heart of Mattakara,  St. Joseph H.S, Manjamattam and Thachilangadu LP School (Government L.P. School) to name a few. There is also a higher secondary school under C.B.S.E syllabus situated at cheppumpara; Cluny Public School and Junior College. The Government of Kerala has put up a Polytechnic here under the aegies of Model Poly Technic Mattakkara - IHRDE to provide technical Education to the rural masses. The Model Polytechnic started functioning in 1995. National Education And Research Foundation established a Photography Institute called Creative Hut Institute of Photography. 
One of the AMIE coaching Institute and Visveswaraya Institute of Engineering Technology and one engineering college, Toms College of Engineering.

Flora and fauna 

All places consist of wet evergreen plants. Hard working farmers of this place play an important role to make this happen. The main vegetation occurs due to rubber plantations which cover 50% of the area. Coconut trees, cocoa, bamboo and other plants can be found here.

The Pannagam river which flows almost around the year also keeps this vegetation.

Topiary art garden 

Topiary is the horticultural practice of training perennial plants by clipping the foliage and twigs of trees, shrubs and subshrubs to develop and maintain clearly defined shapes.

Religion
Place of worship in Mattakkara include:
Holy Family Church Mattakkara
Sree Bhaghavathi Temple Thuruthipalli Mattakkara
Aiyroor MahaDeva Temple Pattiyalimattom
Alphonsagiri Church Nellikunnu
Blessed Sacrament Church Karimpany
St. Sebastian's Church Manjamattam
St. George's Church Mannoor
Kuttiyanickal dharma shastra temple, Manal, https://goo.gl/maps/Jfx4qHRak9G2
st.antony's church paduva
Puthetukavu Devi Temple,  https://goo.gl/maps/r57TjSc2kLx
Kovoor temple, https://goo.gl/maps/9uqw5zQhWxN2

Subdivisions
Mattakkara itself is split into 12 different main smaller areas.
Mannoor
Manal
Vadakkedam
Manjamatam
Chuvannaplavu
Nellikunnu
Karimpany
Pattyalimattam
Cheppumpara
Moozhoor
Paduva
Thachilangadu

Schools And Colleges

Mattakkara High School, https://goo.gl/maps/49R3qbnKdAP2
Toms College Of Engineering For Startups
Creative Hut Institute Of Photography
Thachilangadu LP School, https://goo.gl/maps/7aYtjX3VbHD2
List of all Anganwadis in Mattakkara
 Anganwadi Manal (Centre No 17)
 Anganwadi Manjamattom (Centre No 2)
 Anganwadi Karimpani (Centre No 5)
 Anganwadi Thachilangad (Centre No 13)

Banks 
State Bank Of India (State Bank of Travancore), Vadakkedam
Akalakunnam Service Co-operative Bank

References

Villages in Kottayam district